Mother of Asphalt is a 2010 Croatian film directed by Dalibor Matanić. The film is a run-of-the mill social melodrama that highlights the materialistic aspirations of a young couple in their mid thirties and who are unable to perceive the emotional impact and  the consequences thereof.

Plot 
Mare and Janko are a young married couple and both are working. They have a son, Bruno, who is 7 years old. With materialistic aspirations they have acquired an upscale flat in Zagreb on loan basis. Suddenly, just before Christmas, Mare loses her secretarial job. She becomes restless. As she returns home, after a dinner party her husband does not sympathize with her plight but tries to force himself on her for his carnal pleasures. When Mare resists, Janko is furious and beats her up; the scene is set in a silhouetted night sequence with Christmas lights visible at the window. Mare unable to bear the marital torture leaves her husband and goes out of the house with her son in midnight. She seeks shelter with her friend who is not very sympathetic with the step taken by her friend. But her friend's husband is not sympathetic to Mare and asks her to leave the house. She then starts living in her car. She spends the day wandering in the street of Zagreb telling her young son that they are on an "adventure". On Christmas night, Milan, a security guard at a store who is single and quite unimpressive, sees Mare and her son living a crammed space in the car. As a good samaritan, he offers them shelter in the store which he is guarding.

Cast 
 Marija Škaričić as Mare
 Janko Popović Volarić as Janko
 Noa Nikolić as Bruno
 Krešimir Mikić as Milan
 Ozren Grabarić as Ozren
 Judita Franković as Iva
 Lana Barić as Višnja

Production
The film is produced by Ankica Juric Tilic for "Kinorama" and Hrvatska Radiotelevizija and directed by Dalibor Matanić who has also provided the screenplay with Tomislav Zajec. Tomislav Pavlic is the editor. Music score is provided by Jura Ferina and Pavao Miholjević. It has a run time of 104 minutes.

Awards 
The film has received the following awards:
 Golden FIPA 2011 awards
 Fiction: Actress Marija Skaričić, Croatia 
 Fiction, Dalibor Matanić 
 Fiction: Music, Jura Ferina, Pavle Miholjević 
 Pula Film Festival 2010
 Best Actress in a Leading Role: Marija Skaričić

References

External links 
 

2010 films
Croatian drama films
Films set in Zagreb
2010 drama films
2010s Croatian-language films